Dichomeris stygnota is a moth in the family Gelechiidae. It was described by Walsingham in 1911. It is found in Panama.

The forewings are pale fawn, much streaked and shaded with brownish fuscous, the middle of the costa very narrowly whitish ochreous. The brownish fuscous streaks follow the lines of the veins, but the space between them on the fold, along the cell, and from the cell to the tornus is much shaded with the same colour, almost obliterating a discal spot at one-third, another at the end of the cell, and a plical spot about half-way between them. The hindwings are brownish grey.

References

Moths described in 1911
stygnota